Robert W. "Bob" Thompson (born 19 June 1947) is a former Australian rules footballer who played with Essendon in the Victorian Football League (VFL). While with Essendon he won a reserves premiership in 1968. After leaving the Bombers, he played with Subiaco in the West Australian Football League (WAFL), Preston in the Victorian Football Association (VFA) and then returned to his original team, Castlemaine. He was later an assistant coach of Essendon's under-19s and coached Essendon Grammar Old Boys.

Notes

External links 		
		

Essendon Football Club past player profile			
		

Living people
1947 births
Australian rules footballers from Victoria (Australia)		
Essendon Football Club players
Castlemaine Football Club players
Preston Football Club (VFA) players